Albert Frederick Richardson  (March 28, 1868 - March 13, 1932) was an American law enforcement officer and politician who served as twentieth Sheriff  of Worcester County, Massachusetts.

Early life
Richardson was born in Hardwick, Massachusetts on March 28, 1868, to Alonzo Frederick and Martha (Marsh) Richardson.

Death
Richardson died at the Worcester County Jail on March 13, 1932.

References

1868 births
1932 deaths
Sheriffs of Worcester County, Massachusetts
People from Hardwick, Massachusetts
Massachusetts Republicans